Lake Echo may refer to the following places:
Lake Echo (Polk County, Florida), a lake inside the city of Lake Alfred, Florida, United States
Lake Echo, Nova Scotia, Canada
Lake Echo Power Station, Tasmania, Australia